The 1997–98 NCAA Division I men's basketball season concluded in the 64-team 1998 NCAA Division I men's basketball tournament whose finals were held at the Alamodome in San Antonio, Texas. The Kentucky Wildcats earned their seventh national championship by defeating the Utah Utes 78–69 on March 30, 1998. They were coached by Tubby Smith and the NCAA basketball tournament Most Outstanding Player was Kentucky's Jeff Shepherd.

In the 32-team 1998 National Invitation Tournament, the Minnesota Golden Gophers defeated the Penn State Nittany Lions at the Madison Square Garden in New York City.

Following the season, the 1998 NCAA Men's Basketball All-American Consensus First team included Mike Bibby, Antawn Jamison, Raef LaFrentz, Paul Pierce, and Miles Simon. The consensus second team was composed of Vince Carter, Mateen Cleaves, Pat Garrity, Richard Hamilton, and Ansu Sesay.

Season headlines 
 Tubby Smith led the Kentucky Wildcats to its seventh National Championship.

Pre-season polls 
The top 25 from the pre-season AP Poll.

Conference membership changes 

These schools joined new conferences for the 1997–98 season.

Regular season

Conference winners and tournaments 
28 conference seasons concluded with a single-elimination tournament, with only the Ivy League and the Pac-10 choosing not to conduct conference tournaments. Conference tournament winners generally received an automatic bid to the NCAA tournament.

Statistical leaders

Postseason tournaments

NCAA tournament

Final Four – Alamodome, San Antonio, Texas

National Invitation tournament

Semifinals & finals 

 Third Place - Georgia 95, Fresno State 79

Award winners

Consensus All-American teams

Major player of the year awards 
 Wooden Award: Antawn Jamison, North Carolina
 Naismith Award: Antawn Jamison, North Carolina
 Associated Press Player of the Year: Antawn Jamison, North Carolina
 NABC Player of the Year: Antawn Jamison, North Carolina
 Oscar Robertson Trophy (USBWA): Antawn Jamison, North Carolina
 Adolph Rupp Trophy: Antawn Jamison, North Carolina
 Sporting News Player of the Year: Antawn Jamison, North Carolina

Major freshman of the year awards 
 USBWA Freshman of the Year: Larry Hughes, St. Louis
 Sporting News Freshman of the Year: Larry Hughes, St. Louis

Major coach of the year awards 
 Associated Press Coach of the Year: Tom Izzo, Michigan State
 Henry Iba Award (USBWA): Tom Izzo, Michigan State
 NABC Coach of the Year: Bill Guthridge, North Carolina
 Naismith College Coach of the Year: Bill Guthridge, North Carolina
 Sporting News Coach of the Year: Bill Guthridge, North Carolina

Other major awards 
 NABC Defensive Player of the Year: Steve Wojciechowski, Duke
 Frances Pomeroy Naismith Award (Best player under 6'0): Earl Boykins, Eastern Michigan
 Robert V. Geasey Trophy (Top player in Philadelphia Big 5): Rashid Bey, St. Joseph's
 NIT/Haggerty Award (Top player in New York City metro area): Felipe López, St. John's
 Chip Hilton Player of the Year Award (Strong personal character): Hassan Booker, Navy

References